Wilcoxina rehmii is an ascomycete fungus of the Peziza group. It was first described in 1985. It has been identified in France, Kyrgyzstan, Canada, and the United States.

References 

Pezizaceae
Fungi of Canada
Fungi of the United States
Fungi described in 1985
Fungi without expected TNC conservation status